Charles Joseph Warner (March 29, 1875 – September 24, 1955) was an American politician in the U.S. state of Nebraska.  He served for four terms as the 25th lieutenant governor of Nebraska, from 1949 to 1955. Before that, he was a state legislator for twenty-six years and served the first speaker of the state's unicameral legislature.

Warner was born in Lancaster County, Nebraska in 1875.  He graduated from University of Nebraska in 1899 and Columbian Law School in Washington, D.C. in 1902.

He served in the Nebraska House of Representatives from 1901 to 1907, the Nebraska Senate from 1919 to 1937, and the new unicameral legislature from 1937 to 1939.  He made three unsuccessful attempts to run for governor, including against incumbent Gov. Robert Leroy Cochran in 1938.

Warner was also a farmer and cattle breeder.  He died at a hospital in Lincoln on September 24, 1955, during his fourth term as Lieutenant Governor.

His son, Jerome Warner, was a state legislator from 1963 to 1997, and also served as speaker from 1969 to 1971.

References

External links
 Sen. Charles Warner at nebraskalegislature.gov

Lieutenant Governors of Nebraska
1875 births
1955 deaths
People from Lancaster County, Nebraska
Republican Party Nebraska state senators
University of Nebraska alumni
George Washington University Law School alumni
Republican Party members of the Nebraska House of Representatives
Speakers of the Nebraska Legislature